Drøno (also spelled Drønen, Drøna or Drøni) is an island in Austevoll municipality in Vestland county, Norway. The  island lies just off the west coast of the larger island of Huftarøy. People of Drønen are called Drønskrabbe (Drønen Crab).

See also
List of islands of Norway

References

Islands of Vestland
Austevoll